Ian Grant Johnson (born 24 March 1972 in Dundee) is a Scottish former footballer who played as a midfielder. He is currently on the board of directors of Scottish League Two club Brechin City. Johnson began his playing career with Dundee United before moving to Huddersfield Town in England. Returning to Scotland, he played for Clydebank, Alloa Athletic and Montrose before ending his career at Brechin City. Johnson is a Scotland under-21 internationalist, having made six appearances between 1992 and 1993.

Playing career

Club
Johnson played for Dundee United until his mid-twenties, making over eighty appearances for The Terrors. He played eight games for United in 1996–97, which would be his final full season at Tannadice. In November 1997, he signed for Huddersfield Town, where he would spend the next three seasons. In August 2000, he had a month with Clydebank, then moved to Alloa Athletic for the remainder of the 2000–01 season. Two seasons at Montrose followed, before his move to Brechin City in 2003. He retired after leaving the club in August 2007.

International
Johnson represented the Scotland national under-21 football team.

Coaching career
Johnson returned to Brechin City in a coaching role in 2008, going on to work under managers including his former Dundee United teammates Michael O'Neill and Ray McKinnon. When McKinnon subsequently moved on to manage Raith Rovers in June 2015, Johnson went with him. In May 2016, they returned to Dundee United. Johnson's coaching work is part-time, as he is employed as a solicitor.

Outside football
During his playing career Johnson completed a law degree at the University of Dundee. He joined Thorntons, a Dundee solicitors, in 2003 and was made a partner in the firm in 2013.

Honours

Club
Brechin City
 Scottish Second Division: 2004–05

Career statistics

References

External links 
 

1972 births
Alloa Athletic F.C. players
Brechin City F.C. players
Clydebank F.C. (1965) players
Dundee United F.C. players
Huddersfield Town A.F.C. players
Living people
Montrose F.C. players
Footballers from Dundee
Scottish footballers
Scottish Football League players
English Football League players
Scotland under-21 international footballers
Alumni of the University of Dundee
Dundee United F.C. non-playing staff
Association football midfielders